Thorsten Reiß (born August 11, 1984) is a retired German footballer, who currently is working as an assistant manager for 1. FC Kaiserslautern II.

References

External links

1988 births
Living people
German footballers
SG Sonnenhof Großaspach players
FSV Oggersheim players
Stuttgarter Kickers players
SV Elversberg players
1. FC Kaiserslautern II players
3. Liga players
Association football midfielders
Footballers from Mannheim